The 2011 Shamrock Rovers F.C. season was the club's 90th season competing in the League of Ireland and their 5th consecutive season in the top-flight of Irish football. It was also their most successful season in their history. Rovers played a record number of 56 games in the whole 2011 season.

Shamrock Rovers began the season with a 2–0 win over Dundalk in the Leinster Senior Cup at Oriel Park on 22 February. Their first league game, at home, also against Dundalk, ended in a 3–1 win. Rovers were defending League of Ireland champions and in 2011 won the club's 17th league title, becoming champions after a 2–1 win away at UCD. Rovers finished four points ahead of nearest rivals Sligo Rovers.

Furthermore, Shamrock Rovers competed in the Champions League for the first time in the club's history. After beating Flora Tallinn Rovers were knocked out by FC Copenhagen, and entered the Europa League qualifiers. They defeated Partizan Belgrade to qualify for the group stages, the first Irish club to do so. They played in a group with Rubin Kazan, PAOK and Tottenham Hotspur.

Shamrock Rovers also won the All-Ireland tournament, the Setanta Sports Cup, beating Dundalk in the final at Tallaght. But they went out of the FAI Cup to Sligo Rovers in the quarter final and the League of Ireland Cup to St Patrick's Athletic. Rovers entered the domestic tournaments in the Third and Second Round as a result of being a League of Ireland club.

Squad

Technical staff

Pre-season and friendlies
Shamrock Rovers began their pre-season on 1 February against non-league side, Killarney Celtic at Celtic Park. Surprisingly, Killarney Celtic started off positively with a goal in the opening ten minutes of the game. Killarney kept this lead until the 53rd minute when Ciarán Kilduff scored a goal to equalize. From then on Rovers began to get into the game. In the 77th minute, Anthony Murphy put Rovers into the lead with a terrific goal. Followed by this, Stephen O'Donnell and Karl Sheppard both scored with Billy Dennehy scoring twice on the 79th and 86th minute, resulting in the game ending 6–1 to Shamrock Rovers.

Rovers next pre-season game was against First Division side, Cork City on 4 February in Musgrave Park. Just like in the last game, Rovers conceded a goal in the 30th minute. But, Rovers fought back and just after the break, Gary McCabe scored a goal to level both sides. Then on the 75th minute, Patrick Kavanagh scored the winning goal, thus the game ended with Rovers winning 2–1.

Three days later, Rovers played against Celtic XI at Tallaght Stadium. This game was a highly anticipated game due to the high profile of Celtic. The game started off well for Rovers who did not concede a goal in the first half, like in the two previous games. But, in the 55th minute, Daryl Murphy fired past Alan Mannus to put Celtic in the lead. 3 minutes later, Graham Carey scored a goal to win the game for Celtic XI. This was Rovers first defeat this season.

On 13 February, Rovers played their next pre-season friendly against First Division side, Monaghan United in front of a crowd of just 400. Just before the break, Rovers were brought down to 10 men when Dean Kelly was sent off. Then, just 3 minutes before the end of the game, Conor McCormack was sent off. The game ended in a draw. A lot of chances for Rovers made the game very frustrating for Rovers. The man of the match was Dan Murray.

Two days later, Rovers played against IFA Premiership side, Cliftonville. In just under 1 minute, Gary Twigg opened the scoring for Rovers. This lead lasted until 15 minutes into the game, when Eamon Seydak put Cliftonville on level terms with Rovers. After the break, Rovers went on a goal frenzy, with goals from Ciarán Kilduff, Enda Stevens, Karl Sheppard and Gary McCabe to put Rovers ahead. Cliftonville got a consolation goal in the 85th minute to end the game in a 5–2 win to Rovers.

Domestic competitions

League of Ireland

The fixtures for the 2011 season was announced on 23 December 2010, and revealed that Rovers would begin their league campaign against Dundalk at Tallaght Stadium on 4 March 2011.

All of the opening games for the League of Ireland started at the same time, so no team would get an early-head start in the title race. Dundalk started the game off positively with a goal in the 44th minute from Jason Byrne. But, two minutes later, Gary McCabe scored on his league debut for Rovers. In the second half, Shamrock Rovers dominated the game. In under 10 minutes, Rovers topscorer Gary Twigg scored twice to win the game for Shamrock Rovers. The 3–1 win put Rovers into third place in the league table at the end of the first round of league games.

Rovers next match came the following Saturday, away to Sligo Rovers. Shamrock Rovers started off well and in the 6th minute, Gary McCabe scored from a rebound against his former club. Shamrock Rovers remained dominant for the rest game and defended all that Sligo Rovers had to give. This win made it two out of two wins for Shamrock Rovers.

League table

Results summary

Results by round

FAI Cup

Shamrock Rovers, along with the other 20 League of Ireland clubs, entered the 2011 FAI Cup in the third round, the draw for which was made on 9 May 2011. Rovers were drawn at home with First Division side Athlone Town. Goals from Gary McCabe, Chris Turner, Dean Kelly and Billy Dennehy gave Rovers a 4–0 victory and ensured their place in the next round. A replay was required to determine the winner of the fourth round tie between Rovers and UCD after the first match ended in a 2–2 draw. Having played Partizan Belgrade away in the Europa League just 4 days previously, manager O'Neill decided to alter his starting line-up. After a goalless first half which contained chances for both sides, Rovers took the lead through Karl Sheppard in the 61st minute. Ciarán Kilduff doubled Rovers' advantage, but Samir Belhout pulled a goal back for the away side. Pat Flynn, Rovers' captain on the night, was then sent off in the 80th minute for a cynical block on a UCD player as the last man. UCD scored from the resulting free-kick to earn a replay at their home ground. The draw for the quarter-finals was made before the replay; the winner would face either Sligo Rovers or Monaghan United, who had also drawn their fourth round tie. The replay was a much more one-sided affair as Rovers won 6–0, with Billy Dennehy scoring a hat-trick.

Sligo Rovers also won their replay, so they were Rovers' opposition in the quarter-finals. Sligo, who would go on to win the tournament, knocked Rovers out of the competition by winning 1–0. Rovers had the best of the early stages. Karl Sheppard had two good opportunities to score, one of which was cleared off the line by Sligo defender Alan Keane after Sheppard had beaten the goalkeeper. Eoin Doyle scored Sligo's goal shortly afterwards. This was the only goal of the game, although Sligo's Richie Ryan hit the woodwork with a free-kick and both teams had penalty claims turned down.

League of Ireland Cup

Shamrock Rovers, along with St Patrick's Athletic in Pool 3, received a bye to the second round of the 2011 League of Ireland Cup, the draw for which was made on 30 March 2011. Shamrock Rovers were given away tie against Dublin rivals St Patrick's Athletic.

The match, which was one of the most highly anticipated matches of the stage due to the rivalry of the 2 clubs, was played on 25 April.  Rovers looked to have won the game through a Dean Kelly penalty in the 58th minute but St. Patrick's Athletic equalised with a penalty of their own in the 88th minute, scored by Danny North. The teams were forced to play into extra-time, in which neither side scored, thus forcing a penalty-shootout. Rovers only scored one penalty while St. Patrick's Athletic scored three of their four penalties to win the shoot-out and eliminate Rovers.

Leinster Senior Cup

Shamrock Rovers began their campaign in the Leinster Senior Cup in the fourth round. In the draw for this round, which took place on 20 January, Rovers were paired with Dundalk. The match was played on 22 February at Oriel Park, before the start of the league season. Gary O'Neill scored the opening goal in the 35th minute to put Shamrock Rovers ahead. Dundalk had several opportunities to draw level in the second half, although the game finished 2–0 following Stephen O'Donnell's goal in the 78th minute.

Rovers were given an away tie against Bohemians in the quarter-finals. Bohemians had been due to play Sporting Fingal in the previous round, but received a bye as the opposition club was dissolved.

The highly anticipated match took place on 4 July at Dalymount Park. The first half was an entertaining battle between both sides and in the 43rd minute, Dean Kelly scored to put Rovers ahead. Early on in the second half, Ryan McEvoy scored to level the tie. After many good chances from both sides, the match was forced to enter into Extra time. In the 124th minute of extra time, Kevin Feely got a goal to put Bohemians ahead. This goal was enough to separate the sides and thus, eliminated Shamrock Rovers from the competition.

Setanta Sports Cup

Shamrock Rovers competed in the Setanta Cup for the first time this season. As winners of the 2010 League of Ireland, the club received a bye into the quarter finals, where they played against IFA Premiership side Lisburn Distillery, who had overcome UCD in the first round. The first leg took place on 14 March at the New Grosvenor Stadium in Ballyskeagh. Rovers won the game 3–0 by virtue of goals from Karl Sheppard, Ciarán Kilduff and Dean Kelly. The second leg took place on 22 March and finished 4–2; Rovers progressed to the next round 7–2 on aggregate. Gary Liggett capitalised on Pat Flynn's mistake to give Lisburn an early lead before Kilduff equalised for Rovers. Sheppard had already had a shot cleared off the line before the equaliser. Rovers took the lead through Stephen Rice shortly after the restart only for Liggett to score again to level the game. However, 2 goals from Kavanagh in the final ten minutes ensured a victory for Rovers.

The draw for the Semi-Finals took place on 23 March in Belfast. Shamrock Rovers were drawn against either Portadown, of Northern Ireland, or Sligo Rovers, of the Republic of Ireland, who had yet to complete their quarter-final tie. Sligo Rovers went on to win the tie, prompting a rematch of the 2010 FAI Cup Final in which Sligo Rovers had defeated Shamrock Rovers on penalties. The first leg took place on 11 April at the Showgrounds, in Sligo. Ronan Finn's long-range goal and Karl Sheppard's header gave Rovers a 2–0 win over the home side, who had John Russell sent off 15 minutes after coming on as a substitute. The second leg took place on 19 April at Tallaght Stadium. Within three minutes, Sligo Rovers were back in the tie with a goal from Eoin Doyle. Their lead lasted only five minutes, however, as a goal from Karl Sheppard levelled the match. Ronan Finn then hit the post before providing the assist for Dennehy's 25th-minute goal which gave Rovers the lead. The game finished 2–1, giving Rovers a 4–1 aggregate victory and a place in their first Setanta Cup final.

It was also Rovers' opponents, fellow League of Ireland side Dundalk, first appearance in the final of the competition. They overcame Linfield, Glentoran and Cliftonville, all of Northern Ireland, to reach the final. The final took place at Tallaght Stadium on 14 May. Despite the game taking place in their home stadium, Rovers were technically the away team following the drawing of lots. Rovers won the final 2–0 and claimed their first piece of silverware this season. Gary O'Neill opened the scoring in the second half. Billy Dennehy scored in the 93rd minute to secure the title for Rovers.

Shamrock Rovers won 7–2 on aggregate

Shamrock Rovers won 4–1 on aggregate

European competitions

UEFA Champions League

Shamrock Rovers began their UEFA Champions League campaign in the second qualifying round after winning the 2010 League of Ireland. The draw for this round was made in Nyon, Switzerland on 20 June 2011. As one of the League Champions based in Western Europe, the club was seeded in Group 3. The draw paired Rovers with Estonian champions Flora Tallinn.

Rovers played the first leg on 12 July at Tallaght Stadium. The game ended 1–0 to Shamrock Rovers, which was a historic result as it was the first time Rovers had won a Champions League match. Chris Turner scored the winning goal in the 34th minute, just one minute after Flora Tallinn had missed a penalty. Rovers travelled to A. Le Coq Arena in Estonia for the second leg on 19 July. The game ended 0–0, which was enough for Rovers to progress to the next stage of the competition.

The draw for the third qualifying round took place on 15 July; as winners in the second qualifying round, they were placed in the "Champions Route" section. Rovers were drawn with Danish champions F.C. Copenhagen, who had appeared in the group stages of the competition the previous season. The first leg was played in Denmark, as determined by the draw, despite a request by Copenhagen to switch the order of the home and away legs. The game took place on 27 July and was broadcast live by Setanta Sports. Copenhagen went ahead after 4 minutes when Sölvi Ottesen beat Rovers' goalkeeper Ryan Thompson with a header. Both sides had scoring opportunities but the game finished 1–0.

The return leg was held on 2 August and was broadcast live on RTÉ Two. Copenhagen again opened the scoring, through Dame N'Doye, although Chris Turner had earlier hit the crossbar. They scored their second of the game, and third on aggregate, in the 73rd minute through Christian Bolaños. There were no further goals; Rovers' defeat consigned the club to the Europa League play-off round.

Shamrock Rovers won 1–0 on aggregate

Shamrock Rovers lost 3–0 on aggregate.

UEFA Europa League

Play-off Phase

After defeat to F.C. Copenhagen in the Champions League, Rovers went into the Europa League, the secondary European competition. They entered the competition in the play-off round, the draw for which was held on 5 August in Nyon, Switzerland. Rovers were placed as an unseeded team in Pot 1, which meant that they could have faced teams such as Atlético Madrid and Panathinaikos, although the club were eventually drawn against Serbian club Partizan Belgrade. Partizan had also exited the Champions League at the third qualifying round after defeat to Belgian side Genk. In the previous season, Partizan had reached the group stages of the Champions League, so many considered Shamrock Rovers the underdogs.

The first leg, which was broadcast live on RTÉ Two, took place on 18 August at Tallaght Stadium. Rovers started the game with a defensive tactic, but were unable to prevent Nemanja Tomić scoring after only 14 minutes following a dominant opening from the away side. Rovers did improve towards the end of the half, but only after Partizan had wasted several opportunities to increase their lead. Partizan were again the better side in the beginning of the second half, however the introduction of Gary O'Neill brought Shamrock Rovers back into the game as an attacking force. In the 81st minute, Gary McCabe broke through the Partizan defense with the aid of Gary Twigg and scored the equalising goal. Despite further chances for Rovers, the match ended 1–1, leaving the tie in the balance.

The second leg took place on 25 August at Partizan Stadium. The match was broadcast live on Setanta Ireland. Rovers went into the game needing to score at least one goal to avoid being eliminated from the competition, due to the away goal scored by Partizan Belgrade in the first leg. The team started the game nervously and could have conceded after only 3 minutes but for Vladimir Jovancic shooting wide when one-on-one with the goalkeeper. Vladimir Volkov forced a save from Ryan Thompson in the 28th minute, before the Partizan player put his side in front after 35 minutes. Shortly after the interval, Chris Turner came close to scoring for Rovers when his header hit the post. The breakthrough for Rovers came in the 58th minute - a spectacular volley from Patrick Sullivan put the teams back on level terms again. The match went to extra-time as Partizan were unable to convert several chances. Rovers were fortunate to remain level in the game following Stefan Babović's free-kick which hit the woodwork and a reckless challenge by Ryan Thompson which could have resulted in a penalty to the home side. The winning goal came in the 113th minute of extra time. Ciarán Kilduff's shot was only parried away as far as Karl Sheppard, who was taken down inside the penalty area by the Partizan goalkeeper before he could shoot. Midfielder Stephen O'Donnell converted the penalty. The game ended 2–1 to Shamrock Rovers, with Rovers winning the tie 3–2 on aggregate and qualifying for the group stages of the competition. This was the first time an Irish club had qualified for the group stages of a European competition.

Shamrock Rovers won 3–2 on aggregate

Group stage

The draw for the Europa League Group Stages took place on 26 August in Monaco. Based on the UEFA coefficients, Rovers were placed in Pot 4. This meant that they would be drawn with one team from each other pot. Among the teams which Rovers could have faced were Fulham, Atlético Madrid and Stoke City. The draw eventually paired Rovers with Tottenham Hotspur of the English Premier League, Rubin Kazan of the Russian Premier League and PAOK of the Greek Super League. All matches were broadcast live on TV3.

Rovers' first group stage fixture took place on 15 September against Rubin Kazan. Rubin Kazan started off well with a goal from Obafemi Martins in the 3rd minute. Rovers got into the game after the goal but the away side still dominated possession during the first half. Both sides missed penalties in the match, although goals from Christian Noboa and Gökdeniz Karadeniz in the second half ensured victory for Rubin Kazan.

Rovers then travelled to White Hart Lane to face Tottenham Hotspur on 29 September. Tottenham started off well with both Jermain Defoe and Roman Pavlyuchenko hitting the woodwork before half-time. Stephen O'Donnell cleared Roman Pavlyuchenko's header off the line to maintain the deadlock at the end of the first half. It was Rovers who took a surprise lead early in the second half. In the 51st minute, Stephen Rice diverted a long-range shot into the net to put Rovers ahead. Their lead did not last long however - in the 60th minute, Pavlyuchenko equalised from a header. One minute later, Defoe scored to put Spurs ahead. Giovani dos Santos completed the scoring in the 65th minute. The match ended in a 3–1 defeat for Rovers.

PAOK were the opponents on 20 October in Thessaloniki, Greece. PAOK took the lead early in the first half through Costin Lazăr's long range strike. Both sides then had chances to score, but it was Shamrock Rovers who scored the next goal - Karl Sheppard headed in a free-kick from Billy Dennehy. However, Rovers suffered another defeat due to another long range goal from Vieirinha. In the return leg in Dublin, PAOK scored three goals in the first half as they comfortably won the game 3–1, and in doing so eliminated Rovers from the competition. Billy Dennehy scored what proved to be only a consolation goal for Rovers from a free kick early in the second half.

Rovers again failed to pick up any points in their fifth group game, an away game against Rubin Kazan. Nelson Haedo Valdez took advantage of poor defending to score his side's first goal. Their lead did not last long, however, as Ken Oman equalised for Rovers two minutes later. Bibras Natcho's goal gave Rubin Kazan the lead at half-time; their lead would have been greater had Dan Murray not cleared Obafemi Martins' effort off the line. Rubin Kazan scored twice in the second half to complete the scoring, although Karl Sheppard did hit the bar late in the game.

The club's European campaign concluded with a 4–0 home defeat to Tottenham Hotspur; a result that meant that Rovers failed to pick up any points during the group stage. In what was only their second competitive fixture since the end of the domestic season, Rovers had the better of the opening minutes and should have taken the lead after only 2 minutes, but James Paterson's effort was wrongly ruled out for offside. Steven Pienaar's first goal for Tottenham was the first goal of the match. Andros Townsend and Jermain Defoe scored Tottenham's second and third goals respectively. Although Tottenham did score a fourth goal through Harry Kane, it was Rovers who had the best of the second half, while both Jake Livermore and Carlo Cudicini were lucky to avoid red cards after bringing down Rovers players when they were through on goal. This was Michael O'Neill's final match in charge of the club.

Group table

Results

Squad statistics

Appearances/Goals 

Updated 4 November 2011

Top scorers 

Includes all competitive matches. Premier Division scorers appear higher on list when total goals are equal.
Last updated 04/11/11

Disciplinary record 
{| class="sortable" border="2" cellpadding="4" cellspacing="0" style="text-align:left; margin: 1em 1em 1em 0; background: #f9f9f9; border: 1px #aaa solid; border-collapse: collapse; font-size: 95%;"
|- bgcolor=#D3D3D3
!class="sortable" width="50px"|No.
!width="50px"|Pos.
!class="sortable" width="50px"|Nat.
!width="130px"|Player
!width="130px"|Notes
!width="50px" style="background: #FFEE99"| 
!width="50px" style="background: #FFEE99"| 
!width="50px" style="background: #FF8888"| 
|- 
| 7 || MF ||  || McCabe || || 5 || 0 || 1 
|- bgcolor=#D3D3D3
| 13 || DF ||  || Flynn || || 2 || 0 || 1
|-
| 2 || DF ||  || Sullivan || || 12 || 1 || 0
|- bgcolor=#D3D3D3
| 17 || DF ||  || Oman || || 5 || 1 || 0
|- 
| 4 || DF ||  || Sives || || 5 || 1 || 0
|- bgcolor=#D3D3D3
| 18 || MF ||  || Turner || || 9 || 0 || 0
|- 
| 3 || DF ||  || Stevens || || 5 || 0 || 0
|-bgcolor=#D3D3D3
| 9 || FW ||  || Twigg || || 5 || 0 || 0
|-
| 20 || MF ||  || Dennehy || || 4 || 0 || 0
|-bgcolor=#D3D3D3
| 22 || MF ||  || McCormack || || 3 || 0 || 0
|-
| 8 || MF ||  || O'Donnell || || 2 || 0 || 0
|-bgcolor=#D3D3D3
| 14 || FW ||  || Kelly || || 2 || 0 || 0
|-
| 26 || DF ||  || Paterson || || 2 || 0 || 0
|-bgcolor=#D3D3D3
| 11 || FW ||  || Kilduff || || 1 || 0 || 0
|- 
| 5 || DF ||  || Murray || || 1 || 0 || 0
|-bgcolor=#D3D3D3
| 21 || MF ||  || Finn || || 1 || 0 || 0
|- 
| 15 || MF ||  || Kavanagh || || 1 || 0 || 0
|-bgcolor=#D3D3D3
| 19 || FW ||  || O'Neill || || 1 || 0 || 0
|-
| 10 || FW ||  || Sheppard || || 1 || 0 || 0
|-bgcolor=#D3D3D3 
| 23 || DF ||  || Gannon || || 1 || 0 || 0
|- 
| ## || GK ||  || Mannus || Left the club in July || 1 || 0 || 0
|- bgcolor=#D3D3D3

Transfers

In

Out

Records

Rovers played a record number of 56 games in the whole 2011 season.

Overall
{|class="wikitable" style="text-align: center;"
|-
!
!Total
!Home 
!Away
|-
|align=left| Games played          || 56 || 27 || 29 
|-
|align=left| Games won             || 32 || 17 || 15 
|-
|align=left| Games drawn           || 11 || 5 || 6 
|-
|align=left| Games lost            || 13 || 5 || 8
|-
|align=left| Biggest win           || 6–0 vs UCD & 0–6 vs UCD || 6–0 vs UCD || 6-0 vs UCD 
|-
|align=left| Biggest loss          || 0–3 vs FC Rubin Kazan || 0–3 vs FC Rubin Kazan || 0-2 vs Sligo Rovers 
|-
|align=left| Biggest win (League)  || 6–0 vs UCD || 6–0 vs UCD || 4-0 vs Drogheda United 
|-
|align=left| Biggest win (Cup)     || 6-0 vs UCD || 4-0 vs Athlone Town || 6-0 vs UCD
|-
|align=left| Biggest win(Europe) || 1-0 vs Flora Tallinn & 2-1(a.e.t.) vs FK Partizan Belgrade  || 1-0 vs Flora Tallinn  || 2-1(a.e.t.) vs FK Partizan Belgrade
|-
|align=left| Biggest loss (League) || 0-2 vs Sligo Rovers || 0-1 vs Bray Wanderers || 0-2 vs Sligo Rovers
|-
|align=left| Biggest loss (Cup)    || 0-1 vs Sligo Rovers || N/A  || 0-1 vs Sligo Rovers 
|-
|align=left| Biggest loss (Europe) || 0–3 vs FC Rubin Kazan || 0–3 vs FC Rubin Kazan || 1-3 vs Tottenham Hotspur
|-
|align=left| Clean sheets          || 23 || 12 || 11 
|-
|align=left| Goals scored          || 102 || 58 || 44 
|-
|align=left| Goals conceded        || 47 || 25 || 22 
|-
|align=left| Goal difference       || +55 || +33 || +22 
|-
|align=left| Consecutive Victories       || 5 || 5 || 5 
|-
|align=left| Unbeaten run       || 8 || 11 || 5 
|-
|align=left| Consecutive Defeats       || 2 || 1 || 1 
|-
|align=left| Winless Run       || 4 || 4 || 2 
|-

|-
|-
|align=left| Yellow cards         || 103 || 41 || 62 
|-
|align=left| Red cards            || 6 || 4 || 2 
|-
|align=left| Most appearances     ||  colspan="3"|  Billy Dennehy (51)
|-
|align=left| Most minutes played (League)  || colspan="3"|  Dan Murray (2,837) 
|-
|align=left| Top scorer           || colspan="3"|   Billy Dennehy (16)
|-
|align=left| Points               || 77/108 (%) || 42/54 (%) || 35/54 (%) 
|-
|align=left| Winning rate (League)        || % || % || % 
|-

Leinster Senior Cup Matches not counted for the purposes of this table

References

External links
2011 Fixture List & Match Reports

Shamrock Rovers F.C. seasons
Shamrock Rovers